Adam James Davies (born 26 October 1980) is a Welsh cricketer.  Davies is a right-handed batsman who bowls right-arm medium-fast.  He was born in Cardiff, Glamorgan.

Davies played a single Minor Counties Championship match for Wales Minor Counties in 1999 against Cornwall.

From 1999 to 2003, Davies played a number of Second XI matches for the Glamorgan Second XI, before playing his only List A match, which came for Wales Minor Counties against Nottinghamshire in the 2005 Cheltenham & Gloucester Trophy.  In the match he scored 17 runs and took 2 wickets for the cost of 24 runs from 6 overs.

His father, Hugh, played first-class cricket for Glamorgan from 1955 to 1960.

References

External links
Adam Davies at Cricinfo
Adam Davies at CricketArchive

1980 births
Living people
Cricketers from Cardiff
Welsh cricketers
Wales National County cricketers